The 1929 Kopet Dag earthquake (also called the 1929 Koppeh Dagh earthquake) took place at 15:37 UTC on 1 May with a moment magnitude of 7.2 and a maximum Mercalli intensity of IX (Violent). It occurred in the Kopet Dag area of Iran and caused up to 3,800 casualties along the Turkmenistan-Iran border. More than 1,100 were injured.

Damage and casualties 
Within the epicentral area, 3,250 people were killed. Eighty-eight villages in the region were damaged or destroyed, along with damage at Bojnourd. Aftershocks occurred for more than four years after, including one in July 1929 that killed several more people, before finally subsiding in 1933. Fifty-seven diverse locations reported damage, including casualties in Ashgabat, Turkmenistan.

See also
List of earthquakes in 1929
List of earthquakes in Iran

References

External links 

Koppeh Dagh Earthquake, 1929
Earthquakes in Iran
Koppeh Dagh Earthquake, 1929
20th century in Iran
History of Razavi Khorasan Province
History of North Khorasan Province
Earthquakes in Turkmenistan
Earthquakes in the Soviet Union
1929 in the Soviet Union 
May 1929 events
1929 disasters in Iran 
1929 disasters in the Soviet Union